Psača is a village in the municipality of Rankovce, North Macedonia. It is home of the Psača Monastery.

Demographics
According to the 2002 census, the village had a total of 539 inhabitants. Ethnic groups in the village include:

Macedonians 538
Others 1

References

Villages in Rankovce Municipality